Gone Phishin': A Bluegrass Tribute to Phish is a bluegrass tribute album to the rock band Phish led by the Canadian solo artist Brent Truitt. The album features reworked instrumental versions of songs from three Phish albums: Rift, A Picture of Nectar and The Story of the Ghost. The album was successful and a sequel - Still Phishin - was released in 2002.
 
Both volumes are available in a double disc set titled Forever Phishin': The Bluegrass Tribute to Phish.

Track listing
Silent In The Morning  - 4:48
Glide  - 3:59
Rift  - 4:20
Cavern  - 3:50
Wading In The Velvet Sea  - 2:57
Tweezer  - 4:40
Birds Of A Feather  - 3:24
Chalkdust Torture - 4:08
Sparkle   - 4:09
Brian And Robert - 3:13
Water In The Sky  - 2:25
Fast Enough For You - 3:44

Personnel
 Brent Truitt: acoustic and gut string guitars, mandolin
 Earl Palmer: acoustic and gut string guitars
 Richard Bailey: banjo
 Rob Ickes: dobro
 Tim Crouch: fiddle
 Byron House: bass
 
 

2000 albums
Phish tribute albums
Bluegrass compilation albums